Thomas Charles Thompson (18 February 1821 – 26 September 1892) was an English Liberal politician who sat in the House of Commons briefly in 1874 and from 1880 to 1885.

Thompson was the son of Thomas Thompson of Bishopwearmouth and his wife Elizabeth Pemberton, daughter of Richard Pemberton of Sunderland. He was educated at Harrow School. He attended University College, Durham, where he received his B.A. in 1835, his M.A. in 1840, and became a fellow in 1844. 

He was a student at the Middle Temple from 5 November 1840 and was called to the bar at the Inner Temple in 1844. He was a J.P. for Durham and was High Sheriff of Durham in 1869. In 1867, he bought Ashdown Park.

Thompson stood for parliament unsuccessfully at Sunderland in 1868 and at City of Durham in 1871. He was elected Member of Parliament for City of Durham in February 1874, but his election was declared void in May 1874. He was elected at the 1880 general election and held the seat until 1885.

Thompson died at the age of 71.

Thompson married Marianne Moore, daughter of Rev. Richard Moore, rector of Lund, Lancashire, on 3 August 1854.

References

External links
 

1821 births
1892 deaths
Liberal Party (UK) MPs for English constituencies
UK MPs 1874–1880
UK MPs 1880–1885
People educated at Harrow School
Alumni of University College, Durham
Members of the Inner Temple
High Sheriffs of Durham
Members of the Parliament of the United Kingdom for City of Durham